Zaven Yaralian (born February 5, 1952) is an American football coach. He served as an assistant coach for the Chicago Bears, New York Giants, New Orleans Saints and Denver Broncos.

Personal life
Yaralkian and his wife Lorraine have two children, Blake and Garret.

References

1952 births
Living people
American football defensive backs
Syrian people of Armenian descent
American people of Armenian descent
Nebraska Cornhuskers football players
Washington State Cougars football coaches
Missouri Tigers football coaches
Florida Gators football coaches
Colorado Buffaloes football coaches
Chicago Bears coaches
New York Giants coaches
New Orleans Saints coaches
Denver Broncos coaches
Inglewood High School (California) alumni